Element collecting is the hobby of collecting the chemical elements. Many element collectors simply enjoy finding peculiar uses of chemical elements. Others enjoy studying the properties of the elements, possibly engaging in amateur chemistry, and some simply collect elements for no practical reason. Some element collectors invest in elements, while some amateur chemists have amassed a large collection of elements—Oliver Sacks, for example. In recent years, the hobby has gained popularity with media attention brought by element collectors like Theodore Gray.

Acquiring elements
Some collectors attempt to collect very high purity samples of each element. Others prefer to find the element in everyday use. Some are averse to collecting the element as a compound or alloy, while others find this acceptable. Collectors may isolate elements in their own homes. Hydrogen, for example, can be easily isolated via the electrolysis of water.

In addition to the element samples, some element collectors also collect items connected with the element, such as manufactured goods containing the element, rocks and minerals with the element as a constituent or compounds of the element.  Some manufacturers also sell coins made from pure elements, and density cubes made from the pure element can also be sourced on auction sites such as eBay.

Some commercial retailers now cater to the element collecting community, even selling large quantities in sets, since purchasing elements from large chemical companies is frequently prohibited or uneconomical for individuals. There are a number of specialist element providers which retail to the public over the web, sell individual element samples in addition to full and partial element sets. Many also sell elements through auction sites, such as eBay. Established specialist providers include Nova Elements, RGB Elements, Smart Elements, SMT Metalle Wimmer, PEGUYS, Metallium, Collect the Periodic Table, Luciteria, and Onyxmet.
Element collecting presents many challenges: some elements, such as mercury, beryllium, thallium, plutonium, and arsenic are toxic and so are difficult to find or their sale is restricted. Others are extremely rare in commercial use, such as scandium, lutetium, and thulium, and are therefore hard to source or are comparatively expensive. Some, such as caesium, white phosphorus, and fluorine, are too reactive and have restrictions on their shipping; others, such as gallium, react corrosively and very fast with aluminium (e.g., as structural material in aircraft). Some, such as phosphorus and iodine, are controlled due to use in clandestine chemistry. Others, like radon and astatine, are radioactive and have half-lives too short for practical collection in addition to their radioactive hazards. Usually only the stable elements from hydrogen to bismuth (except the radioactive technetium and promethium) are collected, with the exceptions of the extremely long-lived thorium and uranium. It is possible to source other radioactive elements, such as radium (usually in the form of radium sulfate as part of luminescent paint on antique watch hands), americium (in the form of radioactive buttons containing 0.29 micrograms of americium extracted from older smoke detectors), promethium (often in the form of luminous paint in signal lights) and, technetium (which is sold by vendors, usually at very high prices).

See also
Periodic table
Prices of chemical elements

References

Collecting